Video gaming in Indonesia is a growing sector, holding the 16th largest market in the world and about half the Southeast Asian market in 2017. Over 40 million people in the country are active gamers, with mobile gaming being the dominant sector in terms of revenue. The development of video games in the country began with imported consoles and arcade centres, prior to developments of online gameplay in PC games and increasing prevalence of the internet cafés. Mobile games began gaining importance as smartphones were introduced.

The Indonesian video game industry contributed about US$1.1 billion to the national economy in 2015, despite only earning a small fraction of the local gaming revenues. Video game piracy is also prevalent across the country, making up the majority of installed games.

History
Development of video games in Indonesia began in the mid-1980s through imported video game consoles such as the SNES, PlayStation and Xbox. Arcade centres also appeared, including major chains Timezone which started in Indonesia at 1995 and Amazone which was established in 2001. According to a designer from Namco Bandai, 1,000 of the 1,500 arcade machines distributed in Asia Pacific operated in Indonesia.

Later on, by the late 1990s and early 2000s PC games such as StarCraft and Counter-Strike caught on alongside their online features. While most of the games were imported, there were several locally developed games such as Nusantara Online (a MMO which featured precolonial Indonesian history). There were also several localised games, such as Audition Online which was localised as AyoDance when it was launched for Indonesia in 2007. This contributed to a major boom in internet cafés (known locally as warnet, a portmanteau of warung internet), which had 2,500 locations across the country in 2002 and 5,000 by 2007.

Due to the size of the Indonesian market, several games were localised specifically for the nation's audience. Examples include South Korean online first-person shooter Special Force which featured levels in Jakarta with the Monumen Nasional as a background and Harvest Moon. Matahari Studios, which closed down in 2010, is often credited as being the first local video game developer in the country, although it more often took outsourcing work from major studios instead of developing its own games.

More recently, growth in the number of smartphone users have fuelled growth in mobile online games, aided by the lower development costs associated for local developers. This change also allowed extension of the playerbase beyond typical youth gamers to a more casual demographic, with the game platforms including Facebook in addition to the application stores of iOS and Android.

The 2018 Asian Games, held in Indonesia, included a demonstration event for Esports.

Statistics

According to gaming researcher Newzoo, in 2017 there were an estimated 43.7 million active gamers in Indonesia, spending a total of US$879.7 million for an average annual spending of US$20.13 per person. This made Indonesia the largest gaming market in Southeast Asia and 16th largest globally, just behind Taiwan and ahead of India. According to Euromonitor, the industry revenues had grown from IDR 1.812 trillion in 2011 to IDR 11.395 trillion by 2016, for a growth of 44.4% annually. Another research from Unity Technologies found that Indonesia's video game market was the fastest–growing in Southeast Asia. Of the 2016 sales, about 98% was through internet retailing in form of software. Sales of video game hardware, including consoles and accessories, amounted to just around IDR 200 billion annually between 2011 and 2016.

Approximately 56% of PC game players in Indonesia are males, with the 21–35 age group making up the largest demographic. According to Euromonitor, Sony consoles are the most popular with a 60.6% market share followed by Microsoft and Nintendo. Mobile games make up the majority of the revenues, with a 52% revenue share in 2015.

Gaming culture
Despite declining in recent years due to the spread of better quality mobile internet, internet cafés are still prevalent in large cities and small towns alike with some providing higher–end computers for competitive gaming. Video Games Indonesia (VGI), founded in 2002, was the oldest gaming community in Indonesia prior to its shutdown in 2016.

A 2013 study estimated the prevalence of video game addiction among Indonesian school students at over 10 per cent, although its authors admitted that improvements to the study's methodology were required to draw a proper conclusion.

Mobile gaming
Mobile games are particularly popular in Indonesia, following growing internet penetration. Strategy mobile games such as Clash of Clans and Game of War: Fire Age were the most popular titles in 2014. There is also a significant competitive scene, with eSports tournaments for mobile games such as Vainglory being held in Jakarta.

Local industry

The Creative Economy Agency (Indonesian: Badan Ekonomi Kreatif or Bekraf), formed in 2015, is the government body responsible for aiding in and managing the development of the gaming industry as part of its task to develop Indonesia's creative industries. It also holds an annual trade show known as Game Prime since 2016, which targets developers from Indonesia and the ASEAN. The Indonesian Game Association (Indonesian: Asosiasi Game Indonesia), formed in 2013, acts as the industry's trade association.

The video games industry in Indonesia comprised 1.77% of the national creative economy (IDR 15.08 trillion) in 2015 according to Statistics Indonesia, with only 20% of developers being part of an association. It sustained at least 2,200 jobs in 2017. However, it contributed only 1.8% to the domestic market according to Anton Soeharyo, chief executive of local developer TouchTen. Director-general of informatics application Semuel Abrijani Pangerapan from the Ministry of Communication and Informatics gave a different figure, at 10 per cent market share in 2016.

Local game developers are targeted to hold 50 per cent of the national market by 2020. In January 2016, chairman of the Indonesian Game Association Andy Suryanto estimated that there were around 1,000 active local game developers in the country. On the other hand, Unity Technologies gave a figure of about 400 developers producing over 1,000 games. Most of the new titles created are targeted towards the PC or the mobile market, with only a single game released for the PlayStation 4 in recent times and none for the other major consoles. Lyto, which publishes foreign MMOs such as Ragnarok Online and Crossfire, was the largest local developer in terms of revenue according to Euromonitor.

Due to various factors, most new Indonesian video game studios do not stay in business for longer than five years. There have been several local mobile game hits, including incremental game Tahu Bulat in 2017. The Ministry of Trade has budgeted US$2.1 million in 2015 to prepare a roadmap and support the gaming industry.

Indonesian video games
Some of the more notable games developed in Indonesia include:
Sentou Gakuen (2011)
Samurai Taisen (2013)
DreadOut (2014)
Legrand Legacy (2018)
Rage in Peace (2018)
Coffee Talk (2020)

Rating

Indonesia has its own game rating system, the Indonesia Game Rating System which was launched by the Ministry of Communication and Informatics in 2016. It categorises video games into the following classifications:
SU/Semua Umur (all ages)
3+ (for ages 3 and up)
7+ (for ages 7 and up)
13+ (for ages 13 and up)
18+ (for ages 18 and up)

Piracy
Video game piracy is common in Indonesia as with software piracy in general, with BSA estimating 84% of all software installed in Indonesia throughout 2013 being unlicensed. Many stores in Indonesia offer illegally downloaded video games burned into DVDs for significantly less than its normal retail price, with Wii games being sold for IDR 20,000 (US$2) or less. Due to the nature of Indonesian copyright laws, video game companies are required to bring the lawsuits against the illegal merchants to court, the cost of which would often outweigh the benefits.

When online-only consoles such as the PlayStation 3 was released in Indonesia, authorised dealers initially controlled the distribution. However, once piracy took up these distributors withdrew from the country, causing a scarcity of authentic video game copies and raising the prices–resulting in further increase in piracy.

Video Game Development

Game developers from Indonesia

Agate International (Not the same as French dev, 'Studio Agate')
Digital Happiness
Drydock Dreams Games (Founders based in France, China & Indonesia)
Lentera Nusantara
MassHive Media
Mintsphere
Mojiken Studio
OZYSOFT
Pikselnesia
Rolling Glory Jam
SEMISOFT Studio
Stairway Games
StoryTale Studios

Misc Games

Own Games (Mobile)
PST Team (Online)
TouchTen Games (Mobile)

Co-development Services

Brandoville Studios (Games art & animation)

Video game publishers of Indonesia

Khayalan Arts (Publisher & dev)
LYTOGAME (Online)
PT Megaxus Infotech (Mobile & online)
PT KREON (Online)
Toge Productions (Publisher & dev)

References

18 Game Offline Android Terbaik – No internet? No problem!

Indonesian culture
Science and technology in Indonesia